Hillier, Hilliers, or variation, may refer to:

People with the surname
 Ben Hillier, British songwriter and  producer
 Bevis Hillier, English art historian, author and journalist
 David Hillier, English footballer
 Craig Hillier (born 1978), a Canadian former professional ice hockey goaltender
 Daniel Hillier (born 1998), a New Zealand professional golfer
 Edwin Hillier, founder of Hillier Nurseries
 Ernest Hillier, founder of the Australian chocolatier Ernest Hillier Chocolates
 Erwin Hillier, German-born cinematographer 
 George Lacy Hillier, English racing cyclist and pioneer of British cycling
 Sir Harold Hillier, English horticulturist
 James Hillier, American hydrogeologist
 James Hillier, Canadian-born American inventor
 James Hillier (actor)
 Jean Hillier, professor at the School of Architecture, Planning & Landscape, Newcastle University
 Joe Hillier, English footballer
 Judith Hillier, British physicist
 Katie Hillier (born 1973/74), British fashion designer
 Ladeana Hillier, American biologist
 Louis Hillier (1868–1960), a Belgian musician and composer of Wallonia
 Meg Hillier, British politician
 Paul Hillier, British conductor, director, and singer (baritone)
 Pete Hillier, English dancer, director, and presenter
 Randy Hillier (ice hockey), Canadian hockey player
 Randy Hillier (politician), Canadian politician
 Rick Hillier, Canadian Chief of the Defence Staff 
 Sean Hillier, English football player
 Steve Hillier, British keyboardist, songwriter and record producer
 Baraguey d'Hilliers (disambiguation)
 Louis Baraguey d'Hilliers (1764–1813), French general 
 Achille Baraguey d'Hilliers (1795–1878), Marshal of France

Places
 Hillier, Ontario, Canada; a hamlet in Prince Edward County
 Hillier, South Australia, Australia; a northern suburb of Adelaide
 Lake Hillier, Western Australia, Australia; a lake
 Hillier Street, Sheung Wan, Victoria, Hong Kong Island, Hong Kong, China
 Sir Harold Hillier Gardens, nursery gardens and arboretum near Romsey, Hampshire, England
 Saint-Hilliers, Seine-et-Marne, Île-de-France, France; a commune

Other uses
 Ernest Hillier Chocolates, an Australian chocolatier
 Hillier Nurseries, a British shrub and tree nursery
 Hillier Cup, a Northhampshire soccer county cup

See also

 Hillyer (disambiguation) 
 
 Hilly (disambiguation)
 Hiller (disambiguation)
 Hill (disambiguation)